Cameron Lee  (born December 28, 1993) is an American football offensive guard who is currently a free agent. He played college football at Illinois State and signed with the New Orleans Saints as an undrafted free agent in 2017.

Professional career

New Orleans Saints
Lee signed with the New Orleans Saints as an undrafted free agent on May 1, 2017. He was waived by the team on June 16, 2017.

Cincinnati Bengals
On June 27, 2017, Lee signed with the Cincinnati Bengals. He was waived by the team on September 2, 2017.

Chicago Bears
On September 3, 2017, Lee was signed to the Chicago Bears' practice squad. He was promoted to the active roster on December 5, 2017. He was waived on May 14, 2018.

Baltimore Ravens
On July 21, 2018, Lee signed with the Baltimore Ravens. He was waived on September 1, 2018.

Arizona Hotshots
In 2018, Lee signed to the Arizona Hotshots for the 2019 season. He was released on January 14, 2019.

References

External links
Illinois State Redbirds bio

1993 births
Living people
American football offensive guards
Illinois State Redbirds football players
New Orleans Saints players
Cincinnati Bengals players
Chicago Bears players
Baltimore Ravens players
Arizona Hotshots players